Francisco Barreto (occasionally Francisco de Barreto, 1520 – 9 July 1573) was a Portuguese soldier and explorer. An officer in Morocco during his early life, Barreto sailed to Portuguese India and was eventually appointed viceroy of the colony. After his return to Lisbon, he was tasked with an expedition to southeast Africa in search of legendary gold mines. Barreto died in what is now Mozambique, having never reached the mines.

Early life
Barreto was born in Faro, Portugal, in 1520, to Rui Barreto and Branca de Vilhena. He received military training in Morocco, and eventually served in Azemmour, near Casablanca.

Governor in Goa

In 1548 Barreto arrived in Portuguese India. He took up the position of viceroy in Goa, headquarters of the colony, in June 1555, following the death of viceroy Pedro Mascarenhas. On the occasion of his investiture, a play by Luís de Camões, Auto de Filodemo, was put on. Barreto later ordered Camões exiled to Macau (also a Portuguese colony) for his satirical Disparates da Índia, which criticized Portuguese life in India.

During his tenure as governor, the intended Catholic Patriarch for Ethiopia arrived, accompanied by an embassy led by Fernando de Sousa de Castello Branco, on 15 March 1556. Because he had more accurate information on matters in that country, Barreto held back most of this party, although allowing Bishop André de Oviedo to continue with some companions. This small group, carried in four small ships, landed at Arqiqo in March 1557, shortly before the Ottoman Empire occupied that port.

According to Robert Kerr in A General History and Collection of Voyages and Travels, Mascarenhas, in a bid to gain a Portuguese ally in the region, had supported a usurper against one Adel Khan, King of Visapur. Mascarenhas died shortly after sending soldiers to aid in the usurper's takeover, and Barreto continued Portuguese support of the usurper until his capture. In 1557, Barreto clashed with Khan's army at Ponda and was victorious.

Barreto also involved in negotiations for a peaceful acquisition of Daman, but they failed. He was more successful in defeating the Rajah of Calicut and in preparing a huge fleet to be sent against the Aceh sultanate. His departure there was halted with the arrival of a new ruler.

Return to Lisbon
Barreto was succeeded by Constantino de Bragança in 1558, and he left Goa for Lisbon aboard the Águia on 20 January 1559. After a damaging storm, she was repaired in what is now Mozambique and set sail again on 17 November the same year. Soon after she sprang a leak, and returned to the African coast.

Barreto returned to Goa on a different boat, almost dying of thirst on the trip. Once back he again set sail for Lisbon, this time on the São Gião. He reached the Portuguese capital in June 1561, 29 months after Barreto first left the city. He was very well received by Queen Catherine of Austria, the regent of Portugal in those days.

In 1564, King Philip II of Spain requested Portuguese naval aid in capturing Peñón de Vélez de la Gomera, an island off the coast of Morocco. Portugal supplied and Barreto commanded a fleet consisting of a galleon and eight caravels alongside Spaniard García de Toledo, and the combined navy took over the island's fort in two days. After this, Philip II sent a personal letter and a medallion with his portrait to Barreto.

Expedition to Monomotapa
After Barreto's return to Portugal, King Sebastian gave him the job of leading an expedition to Monomotapa (Great Zimbabwe) to take over the empire's legendary gold mines. According to historian Diogo de Couto, the reason for the expedition was that Portuguese mercantilists thought that the country needed mines to bring in gold similar to Spain's in the Americas (the country's colonies in Asia were not bringing sufficient wealth back to Portugal). Barreto was given instructions to "undertake nothing of importance without the advice and concurrence" of Jesuit Francisco Monclaros.

Barreto set sail from Lisbon on 16 April 1569, with three ships, 2,000 men, and the title of Conqueror of the Mines, bestowed upon him by the king. The first boat arrived in Mozambique in August 1569, Barreto's on 14 March the next year, and the third ship months later. Although Barreto opted to take the easier route, via Sofala, to the location of the mines, Monclaros demanded that the expedition take the Sena route, as this would lead them to where another Jesuit, Gonçalo da Silveira, had been thrown into a river and killed in 1561. So the expedition set out for Manica, the reputed location of the great mines, via the Sena route.

The expedition sailed up the Cuama river in November 1571, armed with weapons and mining tools, and arrived in the Sena region on 18 December. Barreto sent an envoy to the Emperor of Monomotapa with a request for permission to attack a people called the Mongas, whose territory lay between the Portuguese and the mines. The emperor granted Barreto permission to attack them and even went so far to offer his own men. Barreto, however, declined assistance and marched onward upriver.

The Portuguese fought several battles against the Mongas, victorious in all of them despite the overwhelming numbers due to their guns. According to Kerr, when their king sent ambassadors to Barreto in hopes of securing peace, the soldier tricked them into thinking that the camels used by the Portuguese, creatures foreign to southeastern Africa, subsisted on flesh, leading the Mongas to provide the Portuguese with beef for the camels.

Before the expedition could further progress Barreto was recalled to the Island of Mozambique to deal with one António Pereira Brandão, who was spreading false information about Barreto. The governor removed him from duty as commander of the São Sebastião fort and returned to Sena where his men were waiting. At this point, however, many of the men were sick with tropical diseases, and Barreto too fell ill. He died at Sena on 9 July 1573, having never reached the mines, and was buried at the Igreja de São Lourenço in Lisbon alongside his wife, Brites de Ataíde.

Homem continues the search
Barreto's deputy, Vasco Fernandes Homem, succeeded him as governor and returned with the remaining company to the coast. After Monclaros had left for Lisbon, the expedition to Manica was resumed via the Sofala route. The mines, when finally reached, did not resemble the legends, with the natives only producing very small amounts of gold. After further failure looking for different mines in a neighbouring kingdom, Homem abandoned the search for gold.

See also

Vila-Santa, Nuno, Counter-Reformation Policies versus Geostrategic Politics in the "Estado da India": the case of Governor Francisco Barreto (1555-1558), Journal of Asian History, nº 51 (2017 -2), pp. 189-222. 

Vila-Santa, Nuno, “Between Mission and Conquest: a review on Francisco Barreto´s expedition to Mutapa (1569-1573)”, Portuguese Studies Review, nº 24, 1 (2016), pp. 51-90.

Vila-Santa, Nuno, Do Algarve ao Império e à titulação: estratégias de nobilitação na Casa dos Barretos da Quarteira (1383-1599) - Maracanan, nº 19, Jun-Dez. 2018, pp. 12-35.

Vila-Santa, Nuno, Do Algarve, a Marrocos e à Índia. Francisco Barreto e a Casa dos Barretos de Quarteira (Século XV-XVI), Loulé, Municipal Town Hall and Archive of Loule, 2021

References

1520 births
1573 deaths
People from Faro, Portugal
Portuguese soldiers
Portuguese expatriates in Mozambique
Colonial people in Mozambique
Viceroys of Portuguese India
16th-century explorers
Portuguese explorers
Explorers of Africa
Infectious disease deaths in Mozambique
Portuguese colonial governors and administrators
16th-century Portuguese people